The 2022 Haringey London Borough Council election took place on 5 May 2022. All 57 members of Haringey London Borough Council were elected. The elections took place alongside local elections in the other London boroughs and elections to local authorities across the United Kingdom.

In the previous election in 2018, the Labour Party maintained its longstanding control of the council, winning 42 out of the 57 seats with the Liberal Democrats forming the council opposition with the remaining 15 seats. The 2022 election took place under new election boundaries, which retain the same number of councillors.

Background

History 

The thirty-two London boroughs were established in 1965 by the London Government Act 1963. They are the principal authorities in Greater London and have responsibilities including education, housing, planning, highways, social services, libraries, recreation, waste, environmental health and revenue collection. Some powers are shared with the Greater London Authority, which also manages passenger transport, police, and fire.

Since its formation, Haringey has been continuously under Labour control, apart from a period of Conservative control from 1968 to 1971. Apart from a few councillors from minor parties, all councillors elected to the council have been Labour, Conservative or Liberal Democrat. Since 2002, only Labour and Liberal Democrat councillors have been elected. In the most recent council election in 2018, Labour won 42 seats with 57.3% of the vote and the Liberal Democrats won 15 seats with 23.9% of the vote. The Green Party received 10.4% of the vote and the Conservatives won 7.8% of the vote, though neither party won any seats. The incumbent leader of the council is the Labour councillor Peray Ahmet, who has held that role since 2021.

Council term 
After the 2018 election, Labour councillors elected Cllr Joseph Ejiofor, the incumbent deputy leader of the council and an elected Executive member in the party's Momentum grouping, to be the new council leader. Local party members had voted to endorse a different councillor, Zena Brabazon, to have been the council leader. Peray Ahmet, a former cabinet member Ejiofor had sacked in 2018, became council leader in May 2021 after challenging Ejiofor and winning by 1 vote. 

Ejiofor was blocked by the Labour Party from standing as a candidate in 2022 after the Local Government Ombudsman released a report criticising a council decision not to purchase a house for more than three times its value as part of plans for a development around the site of the former Cranwood nursing home. Ejiofor criticised the Labour Party decision to ban him as "a Kafkaesque process resulting in an unjust ruling" and the LGO's decision as in itself "flawed, because the decision taken was legal and in line with the Council's constitution and would be the same whenever it was reviewed".

Ahmet acceded to the opposition Liberal Democrats' request for an inquiry into how property transactions have been handled by the council, including the Cranwood development.

In October 2018, the Labour councillor Ishmael Osamor, son of the Labour MP Kate Osamor, resigned after pleading guilty to possessing drugs with intent to supply and drug possession. A by-election for his West Green seat was held on 13 December 2018, which was won by the Labour candidate Seema Chandwani.

In spring 2019, Cllr Barbara Blake was expelled from the Labour Party following a complaint that she had supported candidates opposing the Labour Party. The following year, five more Labour councillors: Patrick Berryman, Dana Carlin, Vincent Carroll, Preston Tabois and Noah Tucker, were suspended from the Labour Party Group following complaints being made against them. Carlin was re-instated almost immediately pending a hearing, and Noah Tucker and Preston Tabois were readmitted in 2021, though Tucker was suspended again days later, "based on new material [the Labour Party] was not previously aware of". Carroll was restored to the party just before the AGM in 2021. Berryman was not readmitted to the Labour group, and he, Tucker and Carroll were all ruled ineligible to stand as Labour Candidates at the 2022 election. The Labour councillor James Chiriyankandath left his party in June 2021 after Ahmet's election as council leader.

Like most other London borough councils, Haringey elected councillors under new ward boundaries. The Local Government Boundary Commission for England produced new wards after a period of consultation. The number of councillors will remain the same at 57, representing fifteen three-councillor wards and six two-councillor wards.

Electoral process 
Haringey, like other London borough councils, elects all of its councillors at once every four years. The previous election took place in 2018. The election will take place by multi-member first-past-the-post voting, with each ward being represented by two or three councillors. Electors will have as many votes as there are councillors to be elected in their ward, with the top two or three being elected.

All registered electors (British, Irish, Commonwealth and European Union citizens) living in London aged 18 or over will be entitled to vote in the election. People who live at two addresses in different councils, such as university students with different term-time and holiday addresses, are entitled to be registered for and vote in elections in both local authorities. Voting in-person at polling stations will take place from 7:00 to 22:00 on election day, and voters will be able to apply for postal votes or proxy votes in advance of the election.

Campaign 
Labour said they would "deliver some of London’s most ambitious Low Traffic Neighbourhoods and borough-wide cycling routes", as well as hundreds more electric vehicle charging points and build three thousand council homes. The Liberal Democrats said they would plant trees and oppose the construction of an incinerator and cancel plans to refurbish council offices. The Conservatives said they would address violence in the borough by "confronting uncomfortable cultural issues" and committing to "more effective policing of low-level crime". They also said they would build more electric vehicle charging points and "clean up the rubbish on our streets".

Charles Wright in OnLondon reported that more Labour candidates had been selected who would support the leader Peray Ahmet in "setbacks for Momentum". Ahmet's deputy leader Mike Hakata was deselected, but was able to become a candidate in a neighbouring Labour ward. The rabbi David Mason though selected for Crouch End ward, failed to get elected. One longstanding councillor, Mark Blake, was not reselected in his ward but stood in the Liberal Democrat stronghold of Fortis Green instead and won; while another, Gideon Bull, who was not allowed to stand as a Labour candidate, stood as an independent candidate instead in his previous ward and lost.

Previous council composition

Summary of results
 164392

Boundary changes had notionally reduced the number of Liberal Democrat seats by 2 in favour of the Labour Party, explaining the discrepancy in seat changes.

Ward results

Alexandra Park

Alessandra Rossetti was a sitting councillor for Alexandra ward

Bounds Green

Justin Hinchcliffe was a sitting councillor for Fortis Green ward

Bruce Castle

Erdal Dogan was a sitting councillor for Seven Sisters ward

Crouch End

Luke Cawley-Harrison was a sitting councillor for Crouch End ward

Josh Dixon was a sitting councillor for Alexandra ward

Fortis Green

Dawn Barnes was a sitting councillor for Crouch End ward

Mark Blake was a sitting councillor for Woodside ward

Viv Ross was a sitting councillor for Fortis Green ward

Harringay

Gina Adamou and Zena Brabazon were sitting councillors for Harringay ward

Hermitage & Gardens

Julie Davies and Mike Hakata were sitting councillors for St Ann's ward

Highgate

Nick da Costa was a sitting councillor for Alexandra ward

Scott Emery was a sitting councillor for Muswell Hill ward

Hornsey

Dana Carlin, Adam Jogee and Elin Weston were sitting councillors for Hornsey ward

Muswell Hill

Pippa Connor was a sitting councillor for Muswell Hill ward

Noel Park

Peray Ahmet, Emine Ibrahim and Khaled Moyeed were sitting councillors for Noel Park ward

Northumberland Park

Kaushika Amin and John Bevan were sitting councillors for Northumberland Park ward

Seven Sisters

Barbara Blake was a sitting councillor for Seven Sisters ward

South Tottenham

Charles Adje was a sitting councillor for White Hart Lane ward

Makbule Gunes was a sitting councillor for Tottenham Green ward

Sheila Peacock was a sitting councillor for Northumberland Park ward

St Ann's

Paul Dennison was a sitting councillor for Highgate ward

Stroud Green

Eldridge Culverwell was a sitting councillor for Stroud Green ward

Tottenham Central

Felicia Opoku and Matthew White were sitting councillors for Bruce Grove ward

Isidoros Diakides was a sitting councillor for Tottenham Green ward

Julia Ogiehor was a sitting councillor for Muswell Hill ward

Tottenham Hale

Ruth Gordon and Reg Rice were sitting councillors for Tottenham Hale ward

West Green

Seema Chandwani and Sarah Williams were sitting councillors for West Green ward

White Hart Lane

Gideon Bull and Anne Stennett were sitting councillors for White Hart Lane ward

Yvonne Say was a sitting councillor for Bounds Green ward

Gideon Bull was elected in 2018 as a Labour councillor

Woodside

Lucia Das Neves was a sitting councillor for Woodside ward

By-elections 
A by-election was held on 9 March 2023 in Tottenham Hale ward following the resignation of Yannis Gourtsoyannis.

References 

Council elections in the London Borough of Haringey
Haringey